The mathematical theory of democracy is an interdisciplinary branch of the public choice and social choice theories conceptualized by Andranik Tangian. It operationalizes the fundamental idea to modern democracies – that of political representation, in particular focusing on policy representation, i.e. how well the electorate's policy preferences are represented by the party system and the government. The representative capability is measured by means of dedicated indices that are used both for analytical purposes and practical applications.

History
The mathematical approach to politics goes back to Aristotle, who explained the difference between democracy, oligarchy and mixed constitution in terms of vote weighting.
The historical mathematization of social choice principles is reviewed by Iain McLean and Arnold Urken.
Modern mathematical studies in democracy are due to the game, public choice and social choice theories, which emerged after the World War II; for reviews see.

In 1960s, the notion of policy representation has been introduced. It deals with how well the party system and the government represent the electorate's policy preferences on numerous policy issues.
Policy representation is currently intensively studied
and monitored through the MANIFESTO data base that quantitatively characterizes parties' election programs in about 50 democratic states since 1945. In 1989, it was operationalized in the Dutch voting advice application (VAA) StemWijzer (= ‘VoteMatch’), which helps to find the party that best represents the user's policy preferences. Since then it has been launched on the internet and adapted by about 20 countries as well as by the European Union.

The theoretical aspects of how to best satisfy a society with a composite program first considered by Andranik Tangian and Steven Brams with coauthors is now studied within the relatively new discipline of judgment aggregation. The mathematical theory of democracy focuses, in particular, on the practical aspects of the same topic.
The name "mathematical theory of democracy" is due to the game theorist Nikolai Vorobyov who commented on the first findings of this kind in the late 1980s.

Content of the theory
Like the social choice theory, the mathematical theory of democracy analyzes the collective choice from a given list of candidates. However, these theories differ in both the methodology and the data used. The social choice theory operates on the voters’ preference orders of the candidates and applies an axiomatic approach to find impeccable solutions. The mathematical theory of democracy is based on the candidates’ and the electorate's positions on topical political questions and finds the representatives (deputes, president) and representative bodies (parliament, committee, cabinet) that best represent the public opinion. For this purpose, several quantitative indices to assess and compare the representative capability are introduced.

It has been proven that compromise candidates and representative bodies can always be found, even if there is no perfect solution in terms of social choice theory. Among other things, it is proven that even among the axiomatically prohibited Arrow's dictators there always exist good representatives of the society (e.g. to be elected as presidents), which implies a principal possibility of democracy in every society – contrary to the common interpretation of Arrow's impossibility theorem. The further results deal with the characteristics and special features of individual representatives (such as members of parliament, chairmen, presidents) and the committees (such as parliaments, commissions, cabinets, coalitions and juries).

Third Vote

The Third Vote is an election method developed within the framework of the mathematical theory of democracy to expand the concept of political representation.
The name "Third Vote" has been used in electoral experiments where the new method had to complement the two-vote German system.
Its aim is to draw voters' attention from individual politicians with their charisma and communication skills to specific policy issues. The question "Who should be elected?'" is replaced by the question "What do we choose?" (Party platform). Instead of candidate names, the Third Vote ballot asks for Yes/No answers to the questions raised in the candidates’ manifestos. The same is demanded by  voting advice applications (VAA), but the answers are processed in a different way. In contrast to VAAs, the voter receives no advice which party best represents the voter's position. Instead, the Third Vote procedure determines the policy profile of the entire electorate with the balances of public opinion on each issue (pro and cons percentages on individual topics). The election winner is the candidate whose policy profile best matches with the policy profile of the entire electorate.

If the candidates are political parties competing for parliamentary seats, the latter are allocated to the parties in proportion to the closeness of their policy profiles to that of the electorate. 
When considering decision options instead of candidates, the questions focus on their specific characteristics.

The multi-voter paradoxes of Condorcet and Kenneth Arrow are circumvented because the entire electorate with its opinion profile is viewed as a single agent, or a single voter.

Applications

Societal applications
 Inefficiency of democracy in an unstable society
 Quantitative analysis and alternative interpretation of Arrow's impossibility theorem 
 Analysis of Athenian democracy based on selection of public officers by lot
 Analysis of election outcomes with estimations of the representativeness of election winners and parliament factions
 Analysis of national political spectra

Non-societal applications
Since some interrelated objects or processes "represent" one another with certain time delays, revealing the best "representatives" or "anticipators" can be used for predictions. This technique is implemented in the following applications:
 Predicting share price fluctuations, since some of them (e.g. in the USA) "represent in advance" some other share price fluctuations (e.g. in Germany)
 Traffic light control and coordination, since situations at certain crossroads represent in advance the situation at some other crossroads

References 

Social choice theory
Public choice theory